Andrew Christian is an American men's underwear, swimwear, sportswear and lingerie manufacturer named after its founder, Andrew Christian.

History
Andrew Christian  started the clothing line in 1997. He sold his clothing in boutiques. He chose a generic cross icon for his logo as he wanted to avoid religious connotations.

The regular fashions were followed, over the years, by sportswear, swimwear, and then underwear, "and that's when things really took off." In 2006, with the addition of the underwear lines, sales grew exponentially.

In the 2007/2008 season the company produced Obama-themed underwear, donating $1 from every sale to the 2008 Barack Obama presidential campaign.

In 2008 Christian released Black Line, "a higher end dressy line of men's wear," inspired by the clothes he made for himself, and features ready-to-wear tailored pants and vests.

In the 2008/2009 season the company started making clothes for women as well as men. In 2013 it expanded the sportswear lines.

References

External links 
Andrew Christian homepage

Swimwear manufacturers
Underwear brands
Clothing brands of the United States
Clothing companies established in 2001
Manufacturing companies based in Los Angeles
Menswear designers
2001 establishments in California